Poręby Dymarskie  is a village in the administrative district of Gmina Cmolas, within Kolbuszowa County, Subcarpathian Voivodeship, in south-eastern Poland.

The village has a population of 845.

References

Villages in Kolbuszowa County